Artyom "Art" Hovhannisyan (born 16 November 1981 in Gyumri, Armenia) is a retired Armenian professional boxer. He fought  in the super featherweight division.

Amateur career 
Hovhannisyan started amateur boxing at the age of 13. He was taught under internationally known boxing coach, Varuzhan Davtyan. He is a four-time Armenian National Champion in the lightweight division.

Art has had much experience in World and European championships and international tournaments. He has fought in: China, Iran, Czechoslovakia, Croatia, France, Ukraine and many other countries. He has had over 175 amateur bouts and lost only 12 of them.

Professional career 
Artyom moved to the United States in 2007 and trained at the Glendale Fighting Club under Edmond Tarverdyan.

Professional boxing record 

|-
|align="center" colspan=8|18 Wins (10 knockouts, 8 decisions), 4 Losses (1 knockouts, 3 decisions), 3 Draws
|-
| align="center" style="border-style: none none solid solid; background: #e3e3e3"|Res.
| align="center" style="border-style: none none solid solid; background: #e3e3e3"|Record
| align="center" style="border-style: none none solid solid; background: #e3e3e3"|Opponent
| align="center" style="border-style: none none solid solid; background: #e3e3e3"|Type
| align="center" style="border-style: none none solid solid; background: #e3e3e3"|Round
| align="center" style="border-style: none none solid solid; background: #e3e3e3"|Date
| align="center" style="border-style: none none solid solid; background: #e3e3e3"|Location
| align="center" style="border-style: none none solid solid; background: #e3e3e3"|Notes
|-align=center
|Win
|18-4-3
|align=left| Francisco Medel
|TKO
|1
|2018-02-16
|align=left| Sportsmans Lodge, Studio City, United States
|align=left|
|-align=center
|Loss
|17-4-3
|align=left| Jamel Herring
|RTD
|3
|2017-02-10
|align=left| Huntington Center, Toledo, Ohio, United States
|align=left|
|-align=center
|Loss
|17-3-3
|align=left| Diego Magdaleno
|UD
|10
|2016-10-07
|align=left| Belasco Theater, Los Angeles, California, United States
|align=left|
|-align=center
|style="background:#abcdef;"|Draw
|17-2-3
|align=left| Fidel Maldonado
|D
|10
|2016-05-20
|align=left| Fantasy Springs Casino, Indio, California, United States
|align=left|
|-align=center
|Loss
|17-2-2
|align=left| Jonathan Maicelo
|SD
|10
|2014-07-11
|align=left| Little Creek Casino Resort, Shelton, Washington, United States
|align=left|
|-align=center
|Win
|17-1-2
|align=left| Miguel Zuniga 
|UD
|8 
|2014-04-12
|align=left| Hollywood Park Casino, Inglewood, California, United States
|align=left|
|-align=center
|Win
|16-1-2
|align=left| Daniel Attah 
|TKO
|6 
|2013-08-16
|align=left| Chumash Casino, Santa Ynez, California, United States
|align=left|
|-align=center
|Loss
|15-1-2
|align=left| Alejandro Pérez
|UD
|10
|2013-02-22
|align=left| Morongo Casino Resort & Spa, Cabazon, California, United States
|align=left|
|-align=center
|Win
|15-0-2
|align=left| Miguel Acosta
|SD
|10
|2012-07-20
|align=left| Chumash Casino, Santa Ynez, California, United States
|align=left|
|-align=center
|style="background:#abcdef;"|Draw
|14-0-2
|align=left| Cristobal Cruz
|TD
|4 
|2011-08-05
|align=left| Chumash Casino, Santa Ynez, California, United States
|align=left|
|-align=center
|Win
|14-0-1
|align=left| Archie Ray Marquez
|KO
|6 
|2011-06-10
|align=left| Chumash Casino, Santa Ynez, California, United States
|align=left|
|-align=center
|Win
|13-0-1
|align=left| Jose Alfredo Lugo
|KO
|5 
|2011-04-23
|align=left| Nokia Theater, Los Angeles, California, United States
|align=left|
|-align=center
|Win
|12-0-1
|align=left| Cristian Favela
|UD
|8
|2010-07-17
|align=left| Agua Caliente Casino, Rancho Mirage, California, United States
|align=left|
|-align=center
|Win
|11-0-1
|align=left| Hensley Strachan
|TKO
|5 
|2010-03-06
|align=left| Agua Caliente Casino, Rancho Mirage, California, United States
|align=left|
|-align=center
|Win
|10-0-1
|align=left| Adrian Navarrete
|KO
|1 
|2009-10-22
|align=left| Commerce Casino, Commerce, California, United States
|align=left|
|-align=center
|Win
|9-0-1
|align=left| Baudel Cardenas
|KO
|5 
|2009-09-24
|align=left| Club Nokia, Los Angeles, California, United States
|align=left|
|-align=center
|Win
|8-0-1
|align=left| Daniel Gonzalez
|TKO
|6 
|2009-06-12
|align=left| Civic Auditorium, Glendale, California, United States
|align=left|
|-align=center
|Win
|7-0-1
|align=left| Jose Alfredo Lugo
|UD
|6
|2008-09-19
|align=left| Warner Center Marriott, Woodland Hills, California, United States
|align=left|
|-align=center
|Win
|6-0-1
|align=left| Ricardo Delgado
|UD
|6
|2008-02-15
|align=left| Quiet Cannon, Montebello, California, United States
|align=left|
|-align=center
|Win
|5-0-1
|align=left| Terrance Jett
|TKO
|4 
|2007-12-28
|align=left| Quiet Cannon, Montebello, California, United States
|align=left|
|-align=center
|Win
|4-0-1
|align=left| Jose Luis Soto Karass
|KO
|1 
|2007-09-28
|align=left| Quiet Cannon, Montebello, California, United States
|align=left|
|-align=center
|Win
|3-0-1
|align=left| Eric Patrac
|UD
|4
|2007-08-17
|align=left| Quiet Cannon, Montebello, California, United States
|align=left|
|-align=center
|style="background:#abcdef;"|Draw
|2-0-1
|align=left| Youssef Maach
|MD
|6
|2006-07-12
|align=left| Serre Chevalier, France
|align=left|
|-align=center
|Win
|2–0
|align=left| Eric Patrac
|UD
|4
|2006-06-02
|align=left| Port Marchand, Toulon, Var, France
|align=left|
|-align=center
|Win
|1–0
|align=left| Said Moulkraloua
|PTS
|4
|2006-07-04
|align=left| Port Marchand, Toulon, Var, France
|align=left|

References

External Links 
 Official Website: ArtyomBoxing.com
 Gym: Glendale Fighting Club
 Promotion: Lights Out Promotions
 Gary Shaw Promotions
 Association: HyeFighters

1981 births
Living people
Sportspeople from Gyumri
Armenian male boxers
Super-featherweight boxers
21st-century Armenian people